Events in the year 2021 in Barbados.

Incumbents
 Monarch: Elizabeth II (to 30 November)
 Governor-General: Sandra Mason (to 30 November)
 President: Sandra Mason (from 30 November)
 Prime Minister: Mia Mottley

Events

 Ongoing – COVID-19 pandemic in Barbados
 27 July – Prime Minister Mia Mottley announced on the Day of National Significance in Barbados that her cabinet had decided that Barbados would become a parliamentary republic by 30 November, and accepted the recommendations of the Forde Commission
 20 September – Constitution (Amendment) Bill 2021 was introduced to Parliament
 28 September – the House of Assembly passed the Constitution (Amendment) Bill 2021
 6 October – Senate passed the bill
 12 October – incumbent Governor-Genera Sandra Mason was jointly nominated by Prime Minister Mottley and Joseph Atterley, leader of the opposition, as candidate for the first president of Barbados
 30 November – Barbados becomes a republic, Dame Sandra Mason becomes president, replacing Elizabeth II as head of state.

Deaths
23 January – Sylvanus Blackman, weightlifter (born 1933).
6 February – Ezra Moseley, cricketer (born 1958) (Glamorgan, West Indies cricket team, Barbados national cricket team); traffic collision.
16 March – Sir Courtney Blackman, economist and diplomat (born 1933).

References

 
2020s in Barbados
Years of the 21st century in Barbados
Barbados
Barbados